Sir Ellis William Hume-Williams, 1st Baronet KBE, PC, KC (19 August 1863 – 4 February 1947) was a British barrister and Conservative Party politician. Hume-Williams was a King's Counsel (KC), and in October 1901 was appointed Recorder of the Borough of Bury St Edmunds.

Biography
Born to an Anglo-Irish family with Welsh roots, Hume Williams' father was a doctor turned lawyer who built up a large practice in London, 'and was for a time on the staff of the Lancet. Ellis Hume-Williams attended schools in Brighton, Germany, France and Hitchin, before going up to Cambridge University, where he attended Trinity Hall.

Williams showed an interest in politics from an early age, perhaps unsurprisingly, since his father was a member of the Junior Carlton Club, a London Gentlemen's Club associated with the Conservative Party. Hume-Williams was selected to fight North Monmouthshire Constituency at the 1895 general election, losing to Reginald McKenna, but reducing McKenna's majority by almost 400 votes. He fought the Frome constituency at the 1900 general election, but again failed to be elected. At the 1906 general election, Williams fought the North Kensington constituency, another unsuccessful fight. In his autobiography, Hume Williams claimed that he could have secured election for the safe Marylebone constituency, but did not wish to let the North Kensington Conservatives down.

At the January 1910 general election, Hume-Williams was elected as Member of Parliament for the Bassetlaw constituency in Nottinghamshire.  He was created a baronet, of Ewhurst, in the County of Surrey, in 1922. He lost his seat at the 1929 general election to Malcolm MacDonald (son of the Labour Party leader Ramsay MacDonald), and did not stand for Parliament again. He was made a Privy Counsellor in July 1929, shortly after his electoral defeat.

Williams published his autobiography, The World, The House and the Bar in 1930. Besides giving details of his Parliamentary career, this book outlines a number of the legal cases in which he was involved over the years.

References

External links

1863 births
1947 deaths
Conservative Party (UK) MPs for English constituencies
Members of the Privy Council of the United Kingdom
Knights Commander of the Order of the British Empire
UK MPs 1910
UK MPs 1910–1918
UK MPs 1918–1922
UK MPs 1922–1923
UK MPs 1923–1924
UK MPs 1924–1929
Baronets in the Baronetage of the United Kingdom